National Telecom Public Company Limited (NT) (บริษัท โทรคมนาคมแห่งชาติ จำกัด (มหาชน)) is a Thai state-owned telecommunications company. Established and corporatized in 2021 by resulting from the merger of CAT Telecom and TOT Public Company Limited. NT's main line of business is fixed line telephony, mobile telephony, international telecommunications infrastructure, including its international gateways, satellite, and submarine cable networks connections.

Early history
On 1 September 2020, the Cabinet passed a resolution acknowledging the progress of the merger and the use of the new company name resulting from the merger is National Telecom Public Company Limited; NT PCL. Later, on 18 December 2020, Puttipong Punnakanta, Minister of Digital Economy and Society talked to employees and state enterprise labor unions of both TOT and CAT Telecom to communicate the organization's driving in the same direction. This includes communicating accurate information to employees and/or asking questions about the merger to lead to the creation of a new organization. Later, on 7 January 2021, the Ministry of Finance as a total shareholder of both TOT, CAT Telecom and NT PCL. approved the merger between TOT and CAT Telecom to become the National Telecommunications PCL. (NT) with a registered capital of 16,000 million baht. Subsequently, both TOT and CAT Telecom went to register for the establishment NT PCL. at the Department of Business Development, Ministry of Commerce and Puttipong Punnakanta was the chairman of the press conference on the official launch of the NT PCL. this is the completion of the merger of TOT and CAT Telecom.

After the merger and established as NT PCL. has set up a committee to act as the first official set with Mom Luang Chayothit Kritdakorn as the chairman of the board and Gp.Capt. Somsak Khaosuwan, Acting President as for the selection of the first President of NT PCL. may take another 3–6 months. In addition, the NT PCL. has set a goal to compete with the private sector to become one of the top 3 telecommunication providers in Thailand.

References

External links

Telecommunications companies of Thailand
Telecommunications companies established in 2021
2021 establishments in Thailand
Government-owned companies of Thailand
Government-owned telecommunications companies